The 1979 FIBA Europe Under-16 Championship (known at that time as 1979 European Championship for Cadets) was the 5th edition of the FIBA Europe Under-16 Championship. The city of Damascus, in Syria, hosted the tournament. Yugoslavia won the trophy for the second time and tied with the Soviet Union as the most winning countries in the tournament.

Teams

Preliminary round
The eleven teams were allocated in two groups (one of five and one of six teams).

Group A

Group B

Knockout stage

9th–11th round

5th–8th playoffs

Championship

Final standings

Team roster
Srđan Dabić, Nebojša Zorkić, Marko Ivanović, Matej Janžek, Milan Benčić, Zoran Čutura, Dragan Zovko, Tomislav Tiringer, Jurica Kos, Robert Medved, Željko Mrnjavac, and Jurid Kebe.
Head coach: Luka Stančić.

References
FIBA Archive
FIBA Europe Archive

FIBA U16 European Championship
1979–80 in European basketball
1979 in Syrian sport
International basketball competitions hosted by Syria